Kollipara is a village in Guntur district of the Indian state of Andhra Pradesh. It is the headquarters of Kollipara mandal in Tenali revenue division. And it was one of the capital for Pericchedi.

Geography 

Kollipara is located at a distance of 21 km from Tenali. The Nearest city to Kollipara is Tenali.

Governance 

Kollipara gram panchayat is the local government of the village. It is divided into wards and each ward is represented by a ward member. The village forms a part of Andhra Pradesh Capital Region and is under the jurisdiction of APCRDA.

Economy and transportation 
The major occupation of the village is agriculture, which includes cultivation of paddy.

APSRTC operates buses from Tenali, Guntur, Vijayawada and BHEL Township, Hyderabad to Kollipara. The nearest railway stations include Kolakaluru halt and Tenali Junction railway station.

Education 

As per the school information report for the academic year 2018–19, the village has 16 schools. These include 9 private and 7 Zilla/Mandal Parishad schools.

See also 
List of villages in Guntur district

References 

Villages in Guntur district
Mandal headquarters in Guntur district